The Mighty B! is an American children's cartoon series co-created by Amy Poehler for Nickelodeon. The series centers on Bessie Higgenbottom, an ambitious Honeybee scout that believes she will become a superhero called the Mighty B if she collects every Honeybee badge. Bessie lives in San Francisco with her single mother Hilary, brother Ben, and dog Happy. The series was picked up for a pilot in early 2006 under the name of Super Scout. The series premiered on Saturday, April 26, 2008, which was the morning after Poehler's film Baby Mama had premiered. In September 2008, the show was renewed for a second season with 20 episodes. Brown Johnson, president of animation at Nickelodeon, called the show a "break-out hit" that "complements and strengthens" the Saturday morning line-up. The second season premiered on September 21, 2009.

The Mighty B! and its crew have been nominated six Annie Awards, with so far no wins. The show has also been nominated for two Daytime Emmy Awards, winning one for Outstanding Individual Achievement in Animation. The show has also been nominated one Artios Award and one Golden Reel Award.

Many titles of the episodes of the series are parodies of particular media. Examples include "Sleepless in San Francisco" (based on the 1993 film Sleepless in Seattle) and Dirty Happy (based on Clint Eastwood's 1971 film Dirty Harry, which even includes references quotes from the movie).

Series overview

Episodes

Season 1 (2008–09)

Season 2 (2009–11)

DVD releases

References
Notes

1^ "A Pirate's Life for B" was published online on March 29, 2010.

Citations

External links
 
List of episodes at the Internet Movie Database

Mighty B!
Mighty B!
Episodes